Paralida is a genus of moths in the family Gelechiidae.

Species 
 Paralida balanaspis (Meyrick, 1930)
 Paralida triannulata (Clarke, 1958)

References 

Chelariini